Drigh Colony is a neighbourhood in the Korangi District in eastern Karachi, Pakistan. It is part of Shah Faisal Subdivision.

Demographics 
There are several ethnic groups in Shah Faisal Town including Muhajirs, Sindhis, Punjabis, Kashmiris, Seraikis, Pakhtuns, Balochis, Memons, Bohras, Ismailis and Christians.

History 
Drigh Village Refugee Colony is currently known as Shah Faisal Colony.

Drigh Colony was the previous name of Shah Faisal Colony

It was part of Shah Faisal Town which was an administrative unit that was disbanded in 2011.

References

External links 
 Karachi Website 

Neighbourhoods of Karachi
Shah Faisal Town